"Madura" (English: "Mature") is a song by Puerto Rican rapper Cosculluela featuring guest vocals from fellow Puerto Rican rapper Bad Bunny, which was released on April 13, 2018 through Warner Music Latina. The song was both written and produced by José Fernando Cosculluela along with the other producers namely Alex Killer, DJ Luian, Hydro, Lennex and Mambo Kings.

Commercial performance
On the Hot Latin Songs, "Madura" peaked at number 14 and stayed there for 23 weeks. Also, the song charted at 44 and 9 in Argentina and Spain, respectively.

Music video
A music video for "Madura" was released on April 7, 2018 on YouTube.

Charts

Weekly charts

Year-end charts

Certifications

References

2018 songs
Spanish-language songs